Inside Job is a reality show on TNT, which premiered on February 28, 2014. In each episode of Inside Job, a group of four people compete to win a job at a large company; although one of the four contestants is secretly already an employee at that company, and is there not to compete but to judge the others' skills and character.

Episodes

Reception
Brian Lowry of Variety said the show represent a reasonably effective and certainly cohesive one-two combo in speaking to work-related apprehensions.

References

External links
 Official page
 Inside Job on TV.com

2014 American television series debuts
2010s American reality television series
Television series by All3Media
TNT (American TV network) original programming
2014 American television series endings